Ròm is a 2019 Vietnamese film on the topic of crime and violence, directed by Tran Thanh Huy. The film had its world premiere at the 24th Busan International Film Festival on 4 October 2019, where it won the New Currents Award, becoming the first Vietnamese film to receive the award.

Plot

Everyone in an old apartment complex that’s been waiting for demolition work for 10 years is in deep debt. The residents gamble in the hope that they can gain enough money to keep their apartment and achieve their small dreams.
14-year-old Ròm works as bookie lottery runner to earn a living. He lives an unsettling life due to his separation from his parents and always yearns to earn enough money to find them.
Ròm’s rival is Phúc, due to his streak of picking the winning numbers, the people in the apartment complex trust him over Ròm. However, Phúc had been tricking the residents for a long time. Seeing that this isn’t right, Ròm changes this by helping the people pick a good number. Ròm’s number wins and Phúc loses all of his customers to Ròm. Believing in Ròm’s good luck, the tenants want to bet big to settle all of their debts.
But Phúc kidnaps Ròm and takes all of the bets to turn in, and once Ròm finally appears, the creditors are demanding if their debts are not paid off, they will take their apartments.

Betting everything they have, it is now up to Ròm to save the tenants again.

Can Ròm save them again?.

Cast

 Anh Khoa Tran
 Phan Anh Tu Nguyen
 Phuong Cat
 Tran Mai
 Wowy

Release

The film had its world premiere at the 24th Busan International Film Festival on 4 October 2019.

Controversy 
Vietnamese drama film Rom, which was honored with the top award at the Busan International Film Festival (BIFF) last week, has been slapped with a heavy administrative penalty for joining the fest without first acquiring a screening license at home. The Ministry of Culture, Sports and Tourism on Monday imposed a VND40 million (US$1,720) administrative fine on Hoan Khue Film Production JSC (HKFilm) - the production company behind ‘Rom.' The culture ministry also gave the company ten days to destroy the film copy it sent to BIFF, or authorities will coercively enact “spoliation of the evidence." ‘Rom’ is a coming-of-age drama revolving around the story of a young bookie in bustling Ho Chi Minh City, where he tries everything he can to help the residents of an old apartment complex keep their homes and fulfill his dream of finding his parents. According to a source close to Tuoi Tre (Youth) newspaper, the film was not licensed for screening in Vietnam as HKFilm failed to edit out some violent scenes as per the request from a national film evaluation council. Despite lacking a screening license, the production company sent the unabridged version of ‘Rom’ to Busan instead of completing the edit work as required and seeking re-evaluation from Vietnamese authorities, according to the source. Although the Vietnamese culture ministry then requested that the film be withdrawn from the festival, it was still shown at BIFF and eventually shared the festival’s prestigious New Currents Award with Iraq-Qatar co-production ‘Haifa Street’ in a ceremony last Saturday. ‘Rom’ is the first Vietnamese entry to receive the New Currents Award, which is given to the two best feature films selected from the first or second works of new Asian directors introduced in the New Currents section.

On March 31, 2020, Ròm is licensed by the Cinema Department (Ministry of Culture, Sports and Tourism). This movie is tied to an age limit of C18.

Accolades

References

External links
 

2019 films
Vietnamese crime films
2019 crime films